Tanya Bailey (born 15 March 1981 in Dampier, Western Australia) is an Australian amateur BMX cyclist. Bailey has been a part of the national BMX cycling team for more than 10 years, but granted her first and only opportunity to represent her nation Australia at the 2008 Summer Olympics, where she became a semifinalist in the women's elite category. In that same year, Bailey has also reached her ample success in the sport, finishing second at the Australian national championships and Supercross World Cup, both were held in Adelaide, South Australia. Throughout her sporting career, Bailey has been training with her personal and assistant national coach Wade Bootes for the Wanneroo BMX Club in Gold Coast, Queensland.

Along with her teammate Nicole Callisto, Bailey qualified for the Australian squad in women's BMX cycling at the 2008 Summer Olympics in Beijing by receiving one of the nation's two available berths from the Union Cycliste Internationale, based on her best performance at the UCI World Championships in Taiyuan, China. Although she was ranked no. 9 in the UCI rankings for female BMX cyclists and grabbed a tenth seed on the morning prelims with a time of 38.285, Bailey could not match a stellar ride in her semifinal heat with two unfulfilled attempts, a total of 22 positioning points, and an eighth-place finish, thus eliminating her from the tournament.

References

External links
 
 
 
 
 Australian Olympic Team Profile
 NBC 2008 Olympics profile

1981 births
Living people
BMX riders
Australian female cyclists
Olympic cyclists of Australia
Cyclists at the 2008 Summer Olympics
People from Dampier, Western Australia
Sportswomen from Western Australia